Guthrie is a ghost town in Greenlee County, Arizona, United States.

References

External links
 Guthrie – ghosttowns.com

Populated places in Greenlee County, Arizona
Ghost towns in Arizona